Xavier Justis Tillman Sr. (born January 12, 1999) is an American professional basketball player for the Memphis Grizzlies of the National Basketball Association (NBA). He played college basketball for the Michigan State Spartans.

Early life
In his childhood, Tillman played baseball and soccer, football, and basketball but preferred the latter two sports. He stood  when he was 14 years old. Tillman played Amateur Athletic Union (AAU) basketball for the Grand Rapids Storm.

High school career
In his freshman season for Forest Hills Central High School in Grand Rapids, Michigan, he averaged 13.9 points, 7.6 rebounds and 4.3 blocks per game, earning Associated Press Class A All-State special mention honors. As a sophomore, Tillman averaged 15.5 points and 9.7 rebounds per game and led his team to the regional semifinals with a 23–1 record. He was named Associated Press Class A All-State special mention and to the Detroit Free Press Class A All-State first team.

In the summer of 2015, Tillman announced that he was planning to transfer to Grand Rapids Christian High School in Grand Rapids, citing the lack of cultural diversity at Forest Hills Central and his own desire to "refocus" academically. His decision sparked a legal dispute between his parents, because his father supported his transfer, while his mother wanted him to remain at Forest Hills Central. In August, he was cleared to transfer but could not play in his first semester due to Michigan High School Athletic Association (MHSAA) transfer rules, with an appeal for his immediate eligibility being denied. In his junior campaign with Grand Rapids Christian, Tillman averaged 16 points, 10.4 rebounds, and 2.9 assists, shooting 62 percent from the field, to help his team win conference and district titles. He earned Detroit News Class A Second-Team All-State distinction. As a senior, Tillman averaged 13.9 points, 10.9 rebounds, 5.2 assists and 4.2 blocks per game, guiding his school to a Class A state championship game appearance. He was named a finalist for the Mr. Basketball of Michigan award and collected Associated Press Class A First-Team All-State accolades.

Tillman was a consensus four-star recruit and was considered by recruiting website 247Sports as the best prospect in Michigan. On September 30, 2016, he verbally committed to play for Michigan State over Marquette and Purdue, saying, "They play the best competition, as well as they're such great guys. And it's close to home."

College career

Tillman made his debut for Michigan State on November 10, 2017, recording four points and three rebounds in a 98–66 win over North Florida. On November 19, he posted a career-high nine points, five rebounds, and three blocks in a 93–71 victory over Stony Brook. Tillman grabbed a career-best 12 rebounds on March 18, 2018, in a 55–53 loss to Syracuse in the second round of the 2018 NCAA tournament. Through 35 games, he averaged 2.8 points, 2.6 rebounds, and 0.7 blocks per game. Tillman received his team's Most Improved Player award and shared its Unsung Player award. Through his first season, he lost significant weight in an effort to improve his conditioning.

In his third game as a sophomore, he collected his first double-double, with career-highs of 11 points and 13 rebounds in an 80–59 win over Louisiana–Monroe. On January 21, 2019, Tillman posted 10 points and a career-best five blocks, the most single-game blocks by a Michigan State player since Jaren Jackson Jr. in February 2018. He posted a career-high 19 points and 10 rebounds on February 20, in a 71–60 victory over Rutgers. At the end of the regular season, Tillman was named Big Ten Conference Sixth Player of the Year. On March 31, in the Elite Eight round of the 2019 NCAA tournament, he matched his career-high in scoring with 19 points and nine rebounds to help his team defeat first-seeded Duke, 68–67. Tillman guarded Zion Williamson, first overall pick in the 2019 NBA draft, for much of the game.

Tillman scored a career-high 21 points to go with 10 rebounds in a 94–46 win against Charleston Southern on November 18, 2019. He had 20 points, 11 rebounds, and a career-high six blocks in a 87–69 win over Michigan on January 5, 2020. On February 11, Tillman had 17 points and 11 rebounds and made a game-winning putback dunk with 6.6 seconds left in a 70–69 victory at Illinois. On March 3, Tillman scored 23 points and had 15 rebounds in a 79–71 win against Penn State. At the close of the regular season, Tillman was named to the Second Team All-Big Ten by the coaches and media and was the Big Ten Defensive Player of the Year. He averaged 13.7 points, 10.4 rebounds, 3.0 assists, and 2.1 blocks per game as a junior. Following the season Tillman declared for the 2020 NBA draft, and ultimately opted to remain in the draft.

Professional career

Memphis Grizzlies (2020–present)

Tillman was drafted by the Sacramento Kings with the 35th overall pick in the 2020 NBA draft. However, he was traded to the Memphis Grizzlies on draft night. On November 28, Tillman signed his rookie scale contract with the Grizzlies. On April 20, 2021, he recorded career-highs of 18 points and 14 rebounds in a 137–139 double-overtime loss to the Denver Nuggets.

During the Grizzlies' second play-in tournament game, Tillman recorded eleven points, seven rebounds and three steals in a 117–112 win over the Golden State Warriors. With the win, the Grizzlies qualified for the postseason for the first time since 2017 and faced the top-seeded Utah Jazz during their first round series. Tillman made his playoff debut on May 23, grabbing two rebounds in a 112–109 Game 1 win. The Grizzlies ended up losing the series against the Jazz in five games.

On March 24, 2022, Tillman scored a season-high 16 points, alongside five rebounds, in a 133–103 win over the Indiana Pacers. The Grizzlies faced the Minnesota Timberwolves during the first round of the playoffs. On April 19, Tillman recorded 13 points and seven rebounds in a 124–96 Game 2 win. The Grizzlies went on to win the series in six games, but were eliminated in six games in the second round by the eventual champions, the Golden State Warriors.

Career statistics

NBA

Regular season

|-
| style="text-align:left;"| 
| style="text-align:left;"| Memphis
| 59 || 12 || 18.4 || .559 || .338 || .642 || 4.3 || 1.3 || .7 || .6 || 6.6
|-
| style="text-align:left;"| 
| style="text-align:left;"| Memphis
| 53 || 2 || 13.2 || .454 || .204 || .648 || 3.0 || 1.2 || .9 || .3 || 4.8
|- class="sortbottom"
| style="text-align:center;" colspan="2"| Career
| 112 || 14 || 15.9 || .515 || .281 || .645 || 3.7 || 1.2 || .8 || .4 || 5.7

Playoffs

|-
| style="text-align:left;"| 2021
| style="text-align:left;"| Memphis
| 3 || 0 || 6.0 || .200 || .000 || — || 1.0 || .3 || .3 || .0 || .7
|-
| style="text-align:left;"| 2022
| style="text-align:left;"| Memphis
| 9 || 6 || 15.4 || .720 || .500 || .500 || 3.3 || .7 || .7 || .1 || 4.4
|- class="sortbottom"
| style="text-align:center;" colspan="2"| Career
| 12 || 6 || 13.1 || .633 || .333 || .500 || 2.8 || .6 || .6 || .1 || 3.5

College

|-
| style="text-align:left;"| 2017–18
| style="text-align:left;"| Michigan State
| 35 || 0 || 8.7 || .650 || – || .656 || 2.6 || .3 || .3 || .7 || 2.8
|-
| style="text-align:left;"| 2018–19
| style="text-align:left;"| Michigan State
| 39 || 14 || 24.0 || .605 || .296 || .732 || 7.3 || 1.6 || .9 || 1.7 || 10.0
|-
| style="text-align:left;"| 2019–20
| style="text-align:left;"| Michigan State
| 31 || 31 || 32.1 || .550 || .260 || .667 || 10.3 || 3.0 || 1.2 || 2.1 || 13.7
|- class="sortbottom"
| style="text-align:center;" colspan="2"| Career
| 105 || 45 || 21.3 || .582 || .273 || .695 || 6.6 || 1.6 || .8 || 1.5 || 8.7

Personal life
Tillman is the son of Roosevelt Tillman and Tanya Powell-May. His mother played four years of college basketball for Michigan, earning second-team All-Big Ten honors as a senior in 1990 and leaving as the program's all-time rebounding leader. His parents divorced in 2010 and shared physical and legal custody over him.

He has three older brothers, R.J., Ben, and Parker, and a younger sister, Madisyn. Parker was a two-time state champion in both wrestling and rugby while attending Forest Hills Central High School and played football for Northwood University. Tillman and his wife Tamia Tillman have a daughter Ayanna Tillman, who was born in December 2016, and a son, Xavier Jr, who was born on February 17, 2020. The family lived together in a family housing unit at Michigan State University. Michigan State head coach Tom Izzo credited Tillman's improvement as a basketball player to Ayanna.

References

External links
Michigan State Spartans bio

1999 births
Living people
African-American basketball players
American men's basketball players
Basketball players from Grand Rapids, Michigan
Memphis Grizzlies players
Michigan State Spartans men's basketball players
Power forwards (basketball)
Sacramento Kings draft picks
21st-century African-American sportspeople